Lecanthus is a genus of flowering plants belonging to the family Urticaceae.

Its native range is Tropical Africa, Tropical and Subtropical Asia to Southwestern Pacific.

Species:

Lecanthus peduncularis 
Lecanthus petelotii 
Lecanthus pileoides

References

Urticaceae
Urticaceae genera